MDN may refer to:

Computing and technology
 MDN Web Docs (formerly Mozilla Developer Network), a Mozilla website for developer documentation
 Message Disposition Notification, a form of return receipt for e-mail
 Telephone number for mobile devices, as in:
 Mobile device number
 Mobile dialable number
 Mobile directory number

Organizations
 Ministry of National Defence (Portugal) (Ministério da Defesa Nacional), the Portuguese defence ministry
 Nicaraguan Democratic Movement (Movimiento Demócratico Nicaragüense)

Transport
 Macedon railway station, Victoria, Australia (station code: MDN)
 Madison Municipal Airport (Indiana), Madison, Indiana, United States (IATA code: MDN)
 Maiden Newton railway station, England (National Rail station code: MDN)
 Medan railway station, North Sumatra, Indonesia (station code: MDN)
 Meriden (Amtrak station), Connecticut, United States (Amtrak station code: MDN)
 Minggang East railway station, China (China Railway telegraph code: MDN)
 Morden tube station (London Underground station code: MDN)
 Mudan Airlines, Somali Republic (ICAO code: MDN)

Other uses
 East German mark (Mark der Deutschen Notenbank), the official unit of currency in East Germany from 1964 to 1967
 Maya Day Number, the sum of days in Mesoamerican Long Count calendar
 Mbati language (ISO 639-3: mdn)
 MdN Interactive, the magazine for Macintosh designers Network
 MDN, a television station in Griffith, New South Wales, and sister station of MTN